The women's singles was one of five events of the 1923 World Hard Court Championships tennis tournament held in Paris, France from 19 until 27 May 1923. The draw consisted of 38 players. Suzanne Lenglen, the two-time defending champion, defeated Kitty McKane 6–3, 6–3 in the final to win her 4th Championship title.

Draw

Finals

Top half

Section 1

Section 2

Bottom half

Section 3

Section 4

References 

Women's Singles
World Hard Court Championships